Rabat-Salé-Zemmour-Zaër (Berber: Errbaṭ-Sla-Zemmur-Zɛir) was formerly one of the sixteen regions of Morocco from 1997 to 2015. It was situated in north-western Morocco. It covered an area of 9,580 km², and had a population of 2,676,754 (2014 census). The capital was Rabat.

Administrative divisions
The region is made up into the following provinces and prefectures :

 Prefecture of Rabat (now part of the Rabat-Salé-Kénitra Region)
 Prefecture of Salé (now part of the Rabat-Salé-Kénitra Region)
 Prefecture of Skhirat-Témara (now part of the Rabat-Salé-Kénitra Region)
 Khemisset Province (now part of the Rabat-Salé-Kénitra Region)

History
Most of the population of this region has historically been concentrated in coastal areas.  The first recorded history is centered at Chellah, an early Phoenician settlement at the edge of Rabat along the southern bank of the Oued Bou Regreg. Later the Romans took control and enlarged Chellah, whose ruins are today a prominent archaeological point of interest.  Chellah was a significant ancient port city town with remains including the Decumanus Maximus, a forum, a monumental fountain, a triumphal arch, and other ruins.

In the seventeenth century the first regional governmental entity was formed, unifying Rabat and Salé.  This regime was the headquarters of Barbary pirates and held sway over a turbulent time.

References

Former regions of Morocco